Marupuram is a 1990 Indian Malayalam-language action thriller film directed by Viji Thampi and written by Renjith and Kaloor Dennis. The film stars Jayaram, Mukesh, Urvashi, Sukumaran, Jagathy Sreekumar, M. G. Soman, Siddique, Lalu Alex, Jagadish and Devan.

Plot
Two friends, Sethu and Roy, are staying at a lodge owned by Rathna and managed by Chakkuni. Sethu and Roy do con jobs to make ends meet and save money to send Roy abroad for a better life. They attempt a burglary that goes wrong and lands them in jail. After their release, Sethu decides to part ways with Roy. Sethu reaches the lodge as he's in love with Rathna. Chakkuni helps Sethu by giving him some educational certificates that belonged to a previous tenant. Sethu changes his name to Albert (the name on the educational certificate) and lands in a job as a company supervisor. Sethu lives in fear that someone will recognize him as Sethu costing him his job and sending him to prison again for forgery. Bharathan Menon, a friend of Sethu's boss and comes to visit him along with his family. His daughter is depressed and refuses marriage. Menon's meeting with Sethu startles and surprises him. He informs Sethu that he has seen him somewhere and starts probing, which frightens Sethu.

Salim comes to town and starts inquiring about Albert. His agenda is to bump off Sethu. his first attempt fails. After Sethu returns, he sees Roy who has come to meet him. After dropping him off, Salim attacks Sethu again but loses his life accidentally.

Issac Thomas investigates Salim's death. He finds a note of Albert's address in Salim's wallet and his encounter with Sethu raises doubt of Sethu's actual identity. The investigation begins and becomes more complex. The real Albert is dead and the suspect list is long, as everyone has a motive to kill Albert. Issac Thomas' investigation leads him from one suspect to another, and finally, it is revealed that it was Francis who killed Albert to protect his brother Binoy & his friends, who raped Menon's daughter while she was eloping with Albert. Francis then dumps Albert's body in Menon's garage and proceeds to blackmail him to get more time for an earlier deal they had between them. Sethu is exonerated and reunites with Roy & Rathnamma.

Cast

References

External links
 

1990 films
1990s Malayalam-language films
Indian action thriller films
Indian prison films
Films directed by Viji Thampi